King of the River is a British television series transmitted by the BBC between 1966 and 1967.

The series centred on the King family and their efforts to maintain their sail-driven barge transport business. It starred Bernard Lee, otherwise known as M in the James Bond films. No episodes are known to exist. Locations used for filming included the Old Neptune pub in Whitstable, Kent and Sheerness High Street, Kent.

Episodes

References

External links
 

BBC television dramas
1960s British drama television series
1966 British television series debuts
1967 British television series endings
Black-and-white British television shows
English-language television shows